Euhoploceras is an extinct genus from a well-known class of fossil cephalopods, the ammonites. It lived during the Jurassic Period, which lasted from approximately 200 to 145 million years ago.

References

Jurassic ammonites
Ammonites of Australia